Finnish Institute may refer to:

Finnish Institute at Athens
Finnish Institute in London
Finnish Institute in Tallinn